Awazu Station (粟津駅) is the name of two train stations in Japan:

 Awazu Station (Ishikawa)
 Awazu Station (Shiga)